William J. Pascrell III is an American lobbyist with the Princeton Public Affairs Group, and has been the Passaic County Counsel. He has worked for United States Senator and Governor Jon Corzine, United States Senator Frank Lautenberg, United States Senator Robert Menendez, Congressman Robert Roe, Herb Klein and Albio Sires as well as Governor James E. McGreevey. Pascrell earned an Emmy Award nomination in the category of Outstanding Talk Program Series for "The Battling Bills," a program he created jointly with Bill Palatucci. Pascrell graduated from Rutgers University and the Eagleton Institute of Politics, and earned a Juris Doctor from Seton Hall University. He is the son of Congressmen Bill Pascrell.

External links
 William J. Pascrell III

American lobbyists
People from New Jersey
Living people
Year of birth missing (living people)